Episyrphus is a genus of hoverflies in the subfamily Syrphinae. Larvae are predatory, often on aphids.

Species

E. balteatus (De Geer, 1776)
E. circularis Hull, 1941
E. flavibasis Keiser, 1971
E. nigromarginatus Vockeroth, 1973
E. petilis Vockeroth, 1973
E. trisectus (Loew, 1858)
E. viridaureus (Wiedemann, 1824)

References

External links
 

Hoverfly genera
Diptera of Africa
Diptera of Europe
Taxa named by Shōnen Matsumura
Syrphini